Suillus pseudobrevipes is a species of edible mushroom in the genus Suillus. It was first described scientifically by American mycologists Harry D. Thiers and Alexander H. Smith in 1964. This fungal species have a distinctive fibrillous annulus. Compare with Suillus brevipes.

See also
List of North American boletes

References

External links

pseudobrevipes
Edible fungi
Fungi of North America
Fungi described in 1964
Taxa named by Alexander H. Smith